Putaqa (Quechua for Rumex peruanus, also spelled Putaca) is a mountain in the Cordillera Negra in the Andes of Peru which reaches a height of approximately . It is located in the Ancash Region, Huaylas Province, Pamparomas District. A small lake named Aququcha (Quechua for "sand lake") lies at its feet.

References

Mountains of Peru
Mountains of Ancash Region